The Madeira Regional Election (1996) was an election held on 13 October 1996 for the legislative assembly and government of the Portuguese autonomous region of the Madeira

The winner of the election in Madeira was, once more, the Social Democratic Party, and Alberto João Jardim was elected president of the Regional Government with an absolute majority for the 6th consecutive time. The percentage gathered by the social democrats was virtually the same of the previous election, however, due to the populational growth of the region, the number of MPs was increased from 57 to 59, and so, the social democrats gained 2 MPs, achieving a total of 41.

The People's Party lost some of its voters, but still managed to keep the 2 MPs, unlike the National Solidarity Party that lost its single MP.

On the left, the Socialist Party increased the voting by 1% and received one more MP. The Unitary Democratic Coalition, led by the Portuguese Communist Party, increased the voting and the number of MPs, stealing one MP from the People's Democratic Union that elected only 1 MP.

Voter turnout was slightly lower, compared with 1992, with 65.3% of the electorate casting their ballot on election day.

Electoral system
In this election, the members of the regional parliament were elected in 11 constituencies, representing the 11 municipalities of Madeira, that were awarded a determined number of member to elect according with the number of registered voters in those constituencies. The method use to elect the members was the D'Hondt method. In this election the number of MPs to be elected rose from 57 in 1992 to 59.

Political parties
A total of 7 political parties presented lists of candidates for the regional elections in Madeira, where 208,486 	 electors could elect 59 deputies to the Legislative Assembly. Of these parties, some of the more prominent:

 Democratic Party of the Atlantic (PDA).
 Democratic Unity Coalition (CDU), an alliance of the Greens and Portuguese Communist Party (PCP).
 People's Democratic Union (UDP).
 People's Party (CDS-PP)
 National Solidarity Party (PSN)
 Socialist Party (PS), leader Emanuel Fernandes.
 Social Democratic Party (PSD), leader Alberto João Jardim.

Results

Summary of votes and seats

|-
! rowspan="2" colspan=2 style="background-color:#E9E9E9" align=left|Parties
! rowspan="2" style="background-color:#E9E9E9" align=right|Votes
! rowspan="2" style="background-color:#E9E9E9" align=right|%
! rowspan="2" style="background-color:#E9E9E9" align=right|±pp swing
! colspan="5" style="background-color:#E9E9E9" align="center"|MPs
! rowspan="2" colspan=5 style="background-color:#E9E9E9" align=right|MPs %/votes %
|- style="background-color:#E9E9E9"
! align="center"|1992
! align="center"|1996
! style="background-color:#E9E9E9" align=right|±
! style="background-color:#E9E9E9" align=right|%
! style="background-color:#E9E9E9" align=right|±
|-
| 
|77,365||56.87||0.0||39||41||2||69.49||1.1||1.22
|-
| 
|33,790||24.84||2.3||12||13||1||22.03||0.9||0.89
|-
| 
|9,950||7.31||0.8||2||2||0||3.39||0.1||0.46
|-
| 
|5,495||4.04||1.0||1||2||1||3.39||1.6||0.84
|-
|style="width: 10px" bgcolor=#E2062C align="center" | 
|align=left|People's Democratic Union
|5,485||4.03||0.6||2||1||1||1.69||1.8||0.42
|-
|style="width: 10px" bgcolor=#000080 align="center" | 
|align=left|National Solidarity
|875||0.64||1.8||1||0||1||0.00||1.8||0.0
|-
| 
|565||0.42||0.2||0||0||0||0.00||0.0||0.0
|-
|colspan=2 align=left style="background-color:#E9E9E9"|Total valid
|width="50" align="right" style="background-color:#E9E9E9"|133,525
|width="40" align="right" style="background-color:#E9E9E9"|98.14
|width="40" align="right" style="background-color:#E9E9E9"|0.1
|width="40" align="right" style="background-color:#E9E9E9"|57
|width="40" align="right" style="background-color:#E9E9E9"|59
|width="40" align="right" style="background-color:#E9E9E9"|2
|width="40" align="right" style="background-color:#E9E9E9"|100.00
|width="40" align="right" style="background-color:#E9E9E9"|0.0
|width="40" align="right" style="background-color:#E9E9E9"|—
|-
|colspan=2|Blank ballots
|991||0.73||0.0||colspan=6 rowspan=4|
|-
|colspan=2|Invalid ballots
|1,534||1.13||0.2
|-
|colspan=2 align=left style="background-color:#E9E9E9"|Total
|width="50" align="right" style="background-color:#E9E9E9"|136,050
|width="40" align="right" style="background-color:#E9E9E9"|100.00
|width="40" align="right" style="background-color:#E9E9E9"|
|-
|colspan=2|Registered voters/turnout
||208,486||65.26||1.2
|-
| colspan=11 align=left | Source: Comissão Nacional de Eleições
|}

Distribution by constituency

|- class="unsortable"
!rowspan=2|Constituency!!%!!S!!%!!S!!%!!S!!%!!S!!%!!S
!rowspan=2|TotalS
|- class="unsortable" style="text-align:center;"
!colspan=2 | PSD
!colspan=2 | PS
!colspan=2 | CDS-PP
!colspan=2 | CDU
!colspan=2 | UDP
|-
| style="text-align:left;" | Calheta
| style="background:; color:white;"|69.9
| 3
| 6.4
| -
| 20.9
| -
| 0.5
| -
| 0.8
| -
| 3
|-
| style="text-align:left;" | Câmara de Lobos
| style="background:; color:white;"|69.8
| 5
| 12.7
| 1
| 6.3
| -
| 5.7
| -
| 3.2
| -
| 6
|-
| style="text-align:left;" | Funchal
| style="background:; color:white;"|49.5
| 15
| 27.2
| 8
| 7.4
| 2
| 6.5
| 2
| 5.9
| 1
| 28
|-
| style="text-align:left;" | Machico
| style="background:; color:white;"|55.4
| 3
| 36.6
| 2
| 2.7
| -
| 1.1
| -
| 2.6
| -
| 5
|-
| style="text-align:left;" | Ponta do Sol
| style="background:; color:white;"|67.6
| 2
| 16.0
| -
| 11.3
| -
| 0.6
| -
| 2.7
| -
| 2
|-
| style="text-align:left;" | Porto Moniz
| style="background:; color:white;"|64.3
| 1
| 27.8
| -
| 4.6
| -
| 0.3
| -
| 0.5
| -
| 1
|-
| style="text-align:left;" | Porto Santo
| style="background:; color:white;"|56.6
| 1
| 37.2
| -
| 3.1
| -
| 0.4
| -
| 0.5
| -
| 1
|-
| style="text-align:left;" | Ribeira Brava
| style="background:; color:white;"|68.9
| 3
| 19.8
| -
| 5.4
| -
| 0.9
| -
| 2.4
| -
| 3
|-
| style="text-align:left;" | Santa Cruz
| style="background:; color:white;"|56.1
| 4
| 28.4
| 2
| 6.9
| -
| 2.0
| -
| 3.7
| -
| 6
|-
| style="text-align:left;" | Santana
| style="background:; color:white;"|65.2
| 2
| 25.6
| -
| 3.7
| -
| 0.8
| -
| 1.6
| -
| 2
|-
| style="text-align:left;" | São Vicente
| style="background:; color:white;"|61.2
| 2
| 24.1
| -
| 10.0
| -
| 0.6
| -
| 1.3
| -
| 2
|- class="unsortable" style="background:#E9E9E9"
| style="text-align:left;" | Total
| style="background:; color:white;"|56.9
| 41
| 24.8
| 13
| 7.3
| 2
| 4.0
| 2
| 4.0
| 1
| 59
|-
| colspan=12 style="text-align:left;" | Source: Comissão Nacional de Eleições
|}

References

External links
Comissão Nacional de Eleições
Legislative Assembly of Madeira - Official website

See also
1996 Azores regional election

Madeira 1996
Madeira